Season 1886–87 was the 11th season in which Hibernian competed at a Scottish national level, entering the Scottish Cup for the 10th time.

Overview 

Hibs reached the final of the Scottish Cup, winning 3–1 to the Dumbarton at Hampden Park.

Results 

All results are written with Hibs' score first.

Scottish Cup

See also
List of Hibernian F.C. seasons

Notes

External links 
 Results For Season 1886/1887 in All Competitions, www.ihibs.co.uk

Hibernian F.C. seasons
Hibernian